Montavilla Park is a  public park in Portland, Oregon's Montavilla neighborhood, in the United States. The park was acquired in 1921. Activist Joey Gibson has hosted a free speech rally in the park.

References

External links

1921 establishments in Oregon
Montavilla, Portland, Oregon
Parks in Portland, Oregon
Northeast Portland, Oregon